Sadler Point is a point within Wilhelmina Bay, lying 2.5 miles (4.0 km) east of Garnerin Point on the west coast of Graham Land. Charted by the Belgian Antarctic Expedition under Gerlache, 1897–99. Named by the United Kingdom Antarctic Place-Names Committee (UK-APC) in 1960 after James Sadler (1751–1828), Oxford confectioner, the first English aeronaut, who ascended in a montgolfier balloon on October 4, 1784.

Headlands of Graham Land
Danco Coast